Telecare is technology-based healthcare such as the monitoring of patient vital organs so that they may remain safe and independent in their own homes.  Devices may include health and fitness apps, such as exercise tracking tools and digital medication reminder apps, or technologies that issue early warning and detection. The use of sensors may be part of a package which can provide support for people with illnesses such as dementia, or people at risk of falling.

Most telecare mitigates harm by reacting to untoward events and raising a help response quickly. Some telecare, such as safety confirmation and lifestyle monitoring have a preventive function in that a deterioration in the telecare user's wellbeing can be spotted at an early stage.

Telecare is specifically different from telemedicine and telehealth.  Telecare refers to the idea of enabling people to remain independent in their own homes by providing person-centred technologies to support the individual or their carers.

Mobile telecare is an emerging service where state of the art mobile devices with roaming SIMs are utilised to allow a client to go outside their home but still have a 24/7 telecare service available to support them. Typical devices that do this are such things as the Pebbell mobile GPS tracker.

The meaning and usage of the term 'telecare' has not yet settled into consistent use. In the UK it is grounded in the social care framework and focuses on the meaning described above. In other countries 'telecare' may be applied to the practice of healthcare at a distance.

Uses of Telecare
In its simplest form, it can refer to a fixed or mobile telephone with a connection to a monitoring centre through which the user can raise an alarm. Technologically more advanced systems use sensors, whereby a range of potential risks can be monitored. These may include falls, as well as environmental changes in the home such as floods, fire and gas leaks. Carers of people with dementia may be alerted if the person leaves the house or other defined area. When a sensor is activated it sends a radio signal to a central unit in the user's home, which then automatically calls a 24-hour monitoring centre where trained operators can take appropriate action, whether it be contacting a local key holder, doctor or the emergency services.

Telecare also comprises standalone telecare which does not send signals to a response centre but supports carers through providing local (in-house) alerts in a person's home to let the carer know when a person requires attention.

It is important to note that 'telecare' is not just a warning system if someone strays from home but is also preventative measure whereby people are brought back and kept in the community through regular communication.
There are now a large range of telecare services available with some of the most well known being the pendant alarm, mobile carephone system, pill dispenser, telephone prompt service the movement monitoring, fall detector and more. Multi-lingual telecare services have now been introduced opening the service up to a wider audience. All play a role in maintaining people's independence and allowing people to stay in their own homes.

The future of Telecare
Technological advances result in the possibility of promoting independence and for providing care from the social initiative sector, which now contemplates eCare, and navigation/positioning systems, such as GPS for people with dementia or other cognitive impairments.

Telecare in the UK
In 2005 the UK's Department of Health published Building Telecare in England to coincide with the announcement of a grant to help encourage its take up by local councils with social care responsibilities.

The UK’s Department of Health’s Whole System Demonstrator (WSD) launched in May 2008. It is the largest randomised control trial of telehealth and telecare in the world, involving 6191 patients and 238 GP practices across three sites, Newham, Kent and Cornwall. The trials were evaluated by: City University London, University of Oxford, University of Manchester, Nuffield Trust, Imperial College London and London School of Economics.

The WSD headline findings after the telehealth trial, involving 3154 patients, included these outcomes:

 45% reduction in mortality rates
 20% reduction in emergency admissions
 15% reduction in A&E visits
 14% reduction in elective admissions
 14% reduction in bed days
 8% reduction in tariff costs

The telecare findings were supposed to be published at some point in the future.  In fact they have never surfaced.  Some patients are still hopeful that telecare will lead to substantial improvements in the quality of services. The research showed that the telecare approach was not cost effective, with an incremental cost per QALY when added to usual care of £92,000.

The Government's Care Services minister, Paul Burstow, stated in 2012 that telehealth and telecare would be extended over the next five years (2012-2017) to reach three million people. This ambition was formally abandoned in November 2013.  In September 2014 NHS England announced a replacement, but much lower profile, new “technology enabled care services” programme.

See also
Assistive technology
Friendly caller program
Wandering (dementia)

References

External links
International Society for Telemedicine & eHealth

Telecommunication services
Welfare
Telehealth
Health informatics